The Kleine Enz  ("Little Enz") is a river of Baden-Württemberg, Germany. At its confluence with the Große Enz in Calmbach, the Enz is formed.

See also
List of rivers of Baden-Württemberg

References

Rivers of Baden-Württemberg
Rivers of the Black Forest
Rivers of Germany